Tribej is a small settlement on the right bank of the Drava River west of Dravograd in the Carinthia region in northern Slovenia, next to the border with Austria.

References

External links
Tribej on Geopedia

Populated places in the Municipality of Dravograd